Unigene Laboratories (OTC:UGNE) was a biopharmaceutical company, engaged in the research and development of peptides for medical purposes.  The company was founded in 1980 and is located in New Jersey.

The company's primary focus is on the development of calcitonin and related peptides for the treatment of osteoporosis.  The company has licensed worldwide rights to its oral parathyroid hormone ("PTH") to GlaxoSmithKline.

Unigene filed for Chapter 7 bankruptcy on July 2, 2013 in the United States Bankruptcy Court of the District of New Jersey. The Chapter 7 case is being administered under case No. 13-24696.

See also
UgMicroSatdb

References

External links
 Corporate website

Biotechnology companies of the United States
American companies established in 1980 
Technology companies established in 1980
Technology companies based in New Jersey
1980 establishments in New Jersey